Atwood is an unincorporated community in Keokuk County, in the U.S. state of Iowa.

History
Atwood contained a post office from 1889 until 1899. The community was named for Daniel Atwood, a railroad official.

References

Unincorporated communities in Keokuk County, Iowa
Unincorporated communities in Iowa
1889 establishments in Iowa